Santa Rita is a town and  municipality located in the Department of Vichada, Colombia.

References

Municipalities of Vichada Department